James Alfred Mackey (25 November 1897 in Ryton, County Durham – 1990) was an English professional footballer as an outside-right.

Career
Mackey joined Coventry City from Newburn Colliery, making his league debut in the 1920–21 season. He played 12 league games before joining Carlisle United. In 1923 he moved to Notts County, scoring once in three games before a move to Lincoln City later that year.

In the summer of 1924, Mackey moved to Luton Town, scoring once in 10 games. He started the next season with Crewe Alexandra, and despite playing 35 games, scoring four goals, left at the end of the season to join West Stanley in his native North-East of England.

He returned to league football with Torquay United, playing in their first ever game in the Football League, a 1–1 draw against local rivals Exeter City at Plainmoor on 27 August 1927. He missed just two games that season, but was kept out of the side at the start of the following season by Dan Kelly. He returned to the side in October 1928 was a regular for much of the remainder of the season.

He left Torquay at the end of the 1928–29 season and subsequently played non-League football for Dartford, Sheppey United, Bexleyheath & Welling, Dargas Sports and VCD Athletic.

References

1897 births
1990 deaths
English footballers
Coventry City F.C. players
Carlisle United F.C. players
Notts County F.C. players
Lincoln City F.C. players
Luton Town F.C. players
Crewe Alexandra F.C. players
Torquay United F.C. players
West Stanley F.C. players
VCD Athletic F.C. players
People from Ryton, Tyne and Wear
Footballers from Tyne and Wear
Bexley United F.C. players
Association football outside forwards